Misty is an album by jazz organist Richard "Groove" Holmes which was recorded in 1966, with one track from 1965, and released on the Prestige label.

Reception

Allmusic awarded the album 4 stars stating "In the mid-'60s, organist Richard "Groove" Holmes had a hit with his medium-tempo rendition of "Misty." This CD reissue has the original short version (which was cut as a 45) plus other medium-tempo ballads performed in similar fashion... the organist's sound is more appealing than some of the tunes".

Track listing 
 "The More I See You" (Mack Gordon, Harry Warren) - 2:24  
 "The Shadow of Your Smile" (Johnny Mandel, Paul Francis Webster) - 4:54  
 "What Now, My Love?" (Gilbert Bécaud, Pierre Delanoë, Carl Sigman) - 5:29  
 "Summertime" (George Gershwin, Ira Gershwin, DuBose Heyward) - 4:57  
 "Misty" (Johnny Burke, Erroll Garner) - 1:58  
 "On the Street Where You Live" (Alan Jay Lerner, Frederick Loewe) - 8:01  
 "Strangers in the Night" (Bert Kaempfert, Charles Singleton, Eddie Snyder) - 2:22
 "There Will Never Be Another You" (Gordon, Warren) - 7:42
Recorded at Van Gelder Studio in Englewood Cliffs, New Jersey on August 3, 1965 (track 5), July 7, 1966 (tracks 1-3) and August 12, 1966 (track 4 & 6-8)

Personnel 
Richard "Groove" Holmes - organ
Gene Edwards - guitar
George Randall (tracks 1-4 & 6-8), Jimmie Smith (track 5) - drums

References 

Richard Holmes (organist) albums
1966 albums
Prestige Records albums
Albums recorded at Van Gelder Studio
Albums produced by Cal Lampley